Prestige is the monthly French magazine dedicated largely for women's fashion, jewelries and lifestyle. The Prestige readers are mainly aged between 25 and 64 years old. The magazine is based in Chebbak Baabda.

History
In 1993, Nadim Publications and Informations (NPI) launched Prestige magazine - an innovative press concept in Lebanon. It has been constantly evolving year after year by introducing new columns into its pages.  Prestige app is now available in Google Play and Apple Store downloadable for your mobile to bring a new way of magazine reading.

Prestige magazine circulates 30,000 copies and are distributed across Lebanon, Egypt, Jordan, Syria, France and Canada. It is also found on MEA's board for a full coverage.

References

External links
 

1993 establishments in Lebanon
English-language magazines
French-language magazines
Lifestyle magazines
Magazines established in 1993
Magazines published in Lebanon
Monthly magazines published in Lebanon
Women's fashion magazines